Havelsee is a town in the Potsdam-Mittelmark district, in Brandenburg, Germany. It is situated on the river Havel, 12 km northwest of Brandenburg.

The Pritzerbe Ferry, a vehicular cable ferry, crosses the Havel between Havelsee and Kützkow.

Mayor
The mayor of Havelsee since 2003 is Günther Noack, he was reelected in 2014 with 83,4 % of the votes.

Protected areas 
Over 80% of the area of the borough of Havelsee is covered by overlapping protected areas of various types. These include the natural monument of Weißes Fenn Marzahne as well as 3 nature reserves and 4 SACs.

Personalities 

 Lothar Kreyssig (1898-1986), magistrate in Brandenburg an der Havel, a member of the Confessing Church, euthanasia opponents and founder of Action Reconciliation Service for Peace, 1937-1971 residing in the Bruderhof at Hohenferchesar
 Walter Kuntze (1883-1960), General of the Wehrmacht

Demography

External links 
 Potsdamer Brandenburger Havelseen, Tourist information

References

Localities in Potsdam-Mittelmark